Verrucidae is a family of asymmetrical sessile barnacles in the order Verrucomorpha. There are about 14 genera and more than 90 described species in Verrucidae.

Genera
These genera belong to the family Verrucidae:

 Altiverruca Pilsbry, 1916
 Brochiverruca Zevina, 1993
 Cameraverruca Pilsbry, 1916
 Costatoverruca Young, 1998
 Cristallinaverruca Young, 2002
 Gibbosaverruca Young, 2002
 Globuloverruca Young, 2004
 Metaverruca Pilsbry, 1916
 Newmaniverruca Young, 1998
 Rostratoverruca Broch, 1922
 Spongoverruca Zevina, 1987
 Verruca Schumacher, 1817
 † Priscoverruca Gale, 2014
 † Youngiverruca Gale, 2014

References

Barnacles
Crustacean families